Joseph Bastianich (born September 17, 1968) is an American restaurateur, winemaker, author, television personality, and musician. He, along with his mother and business partner Lidia Bastianich, co-owns thirty restaurants in four countries, including Osteria Mozza in Los Angeles, which the owners expanded in 2010. Earlier that same year, they teamed up with businessman Oscar Farinetti to bring Eataly, an upscale food and wine market, to Boston, Chicago, Las Vegas, Los Angeles, New York City and London.

Early life and education

Joseph Bastianich was born in Astoria, Queens in 1968, to Istrian Italian immigrants Felice and Lidia Bastianich. His parents were born in Istria (now in Croatia) and moved to the United States in 1958 during the large Istrian exodus. While nationally Italian, public DNA tests have shown that Joe's family on his mother's side is largely of Eastern European descent, due to the multiethnicity of Istria. His mother has stated that she feels very Italian, but that she relates to her Slavic roots too.
Raised working in his parents' Italian restaurant Felidia in Manhattan, he attended Fordham Preparatory School before attending Boston College, where he studied political science and philosophy.

Career
After spending a year on Wall Street as a bond trader, he gave up his newly launched career and ventured into the food industry. He took an extended trip to Italy. In 1993, he opened Becco (Italian for "peck, nibble, savor"), an Italian restaurant with his mother, Lidia Bastianich. He then partnered with Mario Batali to open Babbo Ristorante e Enoteca, an Italian restaurant that gained the prestigious three stars from The New York Times, the first Italian restaurant to gain the award in 40 years. Babbo also has earned one Michelin star. Together they opened seven more restaurants in New York: Lupa, Esca, Casa Mono, Bar Jamon, Otto, Del Posto, and Eataly (an Italian marketplace). In 2010, Del Posto received a four star review from The New York Times, one of only five restaurants in New York to win that award. Their culinary empire has expanded to 10 restaurants in New York, four restaurants in Las Vegas, three restaurants in Los Angeles, two restaurants in Singapore, one Italian market in Chicago, one Italian market in Boston, one Italian market in London, and two restaurants in Hong Kong. After being accused of sexual harassment, Batali gave up his restaurants, selling his shares to Bastianich and his sister Tanya Bastianich Manuali. Otto Enoteca Pizzeria closed during the coronavirus pandemic. When it closed, TimeOut wrote "it was the type of place that was nice yet casual enough to go on any night of the week with plenty of tables the white marble-covered enoteca (offering wine, cheese and salumi) and the more formal dining area focusing on pastas and pizzas. We'll also miss the olive oil gelato."

Bastianich has co-authored two award-winning books on Italian wine, and his memoir, Restaurant Man, became a New York Times Best Seller within a week of its release in May 2012.

He claims to have invented the Everything bagel in 1979, although this  feat is also claimed by other people.

Television
Bastianich was a judge on the American MasterChef series broadcast by Fox until it took too much of his time, and MasterChef Junior until he was replaced on both series by Christina Tosi in the spring of 2015 after he exited the franchise in November 2014. However, he eventually returned to temporarily judge Season 6 of MasterChef Junior on March 2, 2018 and has returned to the judging panel as a full-time judge on MasterChef since season 9, which debuted in June 2018. He was also a judge on the Italian version of the program. MasterChef Italia shown on Sky Uno for its first 8 seasons. In May 2019, Bastianich announced his departure from MasterChef Italia in order to dedicate himself to his passion for music. In mid-September of the same year, Bastianich released his first album, titled "Aka Joe". In late January 2020, he will star in a musical concert tour around Italy, featuring his "New York Stories" album.

He has also guest starred as a guest judge on MasterChef Canada on Season 1, Episode 14. He co-starred alongside Tim Love and Antonia Lofaso in the American reality show Restaurant Startup on CNBC, for which he is the executive producer along with Endemol Shine North America.

Bastianich also made a special appearance in the 2015 television film An American Girl: Grace Stirs Up Success as a judge in a fictional season of MasterChef Junior.
From March 22, 2016, he presented, with Guido Meda and Davide Valsecchi, the first edition of Top Gear Italia. He will also serve as a judge on the judging panel of Italia's Got Talent and Family Food Fight Italia, airing on Sky Uno in the spring of 2020.

Controversy
In an episode of MasterChef Italia which came to the attention of the U.S. media in January 2018, Bastianich makes several remarks about Chinese men while making sexually suggestive comments to women giving him a manicure and pedicure at a beauty salon in Milan's Chinatown. He asks the women if they have ever had Italian boyfriends and remarks that Chinese men are "inadequate" in certain situations. When asked by the blog Grub Street for comment, Bastianich issued an apology:
This was a scripted segment shot in a Milan nail salon that I've gone to regularly. I know the women, and we were given the questions to discuss in advance. That said, it's clear that some of what I said was in poor taste and not reflective of my views. I'm sorry I said those things.

Personal life 
Bastianich lives in New York City, with his wife, Deanna, and their children, Olivia, Ethan, and Miles. He is fluent in Italian.

Bastianich Hospitality Group 

Batali and Bastianich Hospitality Group own several restaurants mostly in New York City and Los Angeles, including  Becca in NYC, Chi Spacca and Osteria Mozza in Los angeles.

Published works
 2015. Healthy Pasta: The Sexy, Skinny, and Smart Way to Eat Your Favorite Food. (Knopf)
 2014. Giuseppino. Da New York all'Italia: storia del mio ritorno a casa. (Potter)
 2013. Restaurant Man. (Knopf)
 2010. Grandi Vini: An Opinionated Tour of Italy's 89 Finest Wines. (Potter)
 2005. Vino Italiano: The Regional Wines of Italy. (Potter)

Television appearances
 MasterChef (US TV series)
 MasterChef Italia
 MasterChef Junior
 Restaurant Startup
 Top Gear Italy

References

External links
 Official website
 Bio from Batali & Bastianich Hospitality Group website
 Bio from Babbo restaurant website
 Bio from Vino Italiano book website

1968 births
Living people
American expatriates in Italy
American financial traders
American food writers
American investors
American memoirists
American people of Italian descent
American restaurateurs
American winemakers
Fordham Preparatory School alumni
Morrissey College of Arts & Sciences alumni
Businesspeople from Greenwich, Connecticut
Businesspeople from Queens, New York
MasterChef (American TV series)
Merrill (company) people
Judges in American reality television series
Participants in Italian reality television series
People from Astoria, Queens
Television producers from New York City
Writers from Greenwich, Connecticut
Writers from Queens, New York
Eataly people